Resorcylic acid lactones are a group of estrogenic compounds. They are lactones of resorcylic acid. Examples include the mycoestrogens (and synthetic analogues) zearalenone, zearalanone, zeranol (α-zearalanol), taleranol (β-zearalanol), α-zearalenol, and β-zearalenol.

References

Dihydroxybenzoic acids
Lactones
Mycoestrogens